A cystic nephroma, also known as multilocular cystic nephroma, mixed epithelial stromal tumour (MEST) and renal epithelial stromal tumour (REST), is a type of rare benign kidney tumour.

Symptoms
Cystic nephromas are often asymptomatic.  They are typically discovered on medical imaging incidentally (i.e. an incidentaloma).

Diagnosis
Cystic nephromas are diagnosed by biopsy or excision.  It is important to correctly diagnose them as, radiologically, they may mimic the appearance of a renal cell carcinoma that is cystic.

Pathologic diagnosis

The characteristics of cystic nephromas are:
Cysts lined by a simple epithelium with a hobnail morphology, i.e. the nuclei of the cyst lining epithelium bulges into the lumen of the cysts,
Ovarian-like stroma that has a:
Spindle cell morphology, and has a
Basophilic cytoplasm.

Cystic nephromas have an immunostaining pattern like ovarian stroma; they are positive for:
Estrogen receptor (ER),
Progesterone receptor (PR) and
CD10.

Differential diagnosis

cystic partially differentiated nephroblastoma
cystic standard nephroblastoma (cystic Wilm's tumor)
cystic mesoblastic nephroma
cystic renal cell carcinoma
other renal cysts

Additional images

References

External links 

Benign renal neoplasms